HMS Agamemnon is the sixth  nuclear-powered fleet submarine of the Royal Navy and is currently under construction. She will be the sixth vessel of the Royal Navy to bear the name, after the legendary Greek king Agamemnon.

On 25 March 2010, BAE Systems were given the go-ahead by the government to begin construction on boats 5 and 6 (Anson and Agamemnon), being given a £300 million contract for the "initial build" of boat 5 and "long lead procurement activities" for boat 6. Initial construction work was begun on boat 6 late in 2010 and is ongoing as of 2011. On 15 September 2011 it was announced that boat 5 was to be named Anson; it had previously been stated that boat 5 (as S123) would be Agamemnon and boat 6 Anson, and it is now believed that the Agamemnon name will be transferred to boat 6.

Her keel was laid on 18 July 2013, when the Minister for Defence Equipment, Support and Technology, Philip Dunne, unveiled the "Agamemnon Keel Unit".

Her electric switchboards were powered up, for the first time, 1 October 2020, making the boat go "live".

Design

Propulsion
Agamemnons nuclear reactor will not need to be refuelled during the boat's 25-year service. Since the submarine can purify water and air, she will be able to circumnavigate the planet without resurfacing. The main limit is that the submarine will only be able to carry three months' supply of food for 98 officers and ratings.

Weapons
Agamemnon will have provision for up-to 38 weapons in six  torpedo tubes.

References

External links
 Royal Navy HMS Agamemnon (royalnavy.mod.uk)

 

Astute-class submarines
Proposed ships of the Royal Navy
Ships built in Barrow-in-Furness